2020 United States Olympic basketball team may refer to:

2020 United States men's Olympic basketball team
The United States women's team competing in basketball at the 2020 Summer Olympics